Higher than the Sun may refer to:

"Higher than the Sun" (song), a 2013 song by Keane
 "Higher than the Sun", a 1991 song by Primal Scream from Screamadelica
"Higher than the Sun", a 2003 song by Natalia Druyts from This Time
"Higher than the Sun", a 2005 episode of Eureka Seven
"Higher than the Sun", a 2013 song by Peace from In Love